There are several languages called Mono:

Mono language (California), an endangered Native American language of the California River basin in the United States
Mono language (Cameroon), an Adamawa language
Mono language (Congo), a Ubangian language spoken by 65,000 people in the Democratic Republic of Congo 
Mono language (Solomon Islands), an Austronesian language spoken on the Solomon Islands by fewer than 4,000 people

fr:Mono#Linguistique